Charles John Wipfler (15 July 1915 – 1 June 1983) was an English professional footballer who played for Heart of Midlothian, Watford and Gravesend & Northfleet.

References

External links 
London Hearts profile

1915 births
1983 deaths
Ebbsfleet United F.C. players
English footballers
Heart of Midlothian F.C. players
Huddersfield Town A.F.C. wartime guest players
Scottish Football League players
English Football League players
Watford F.C. players
Bristol Rovers F.C. players
Trowbridge Town F.C. players
Association football wingers